The Elizabeth Arkham Asylum for the Criminally Insane, commonly referred to as Arkham Asylum, is a fictional psychiatric hospital/prison, named after the city of Arkham which appeared first in the stories of H. P. Lovecraft, and later appearing in American comic books published by DC Comics, commonly in stories featuring the superhero Batman. It first appeared in Batman #258 (October 1974), written by Dennis O'Neil with art by Irv Novick. The asylum serves as a psychiatric hospital for the Gotham City area, housing patients who are criminally insane, as well as select prisoners with unusual medical requirements that are beyond a conventional prison's ability to accommodate. Its high-profile patients are often members of Batman's rogues gallery.

History 
Located in Gotham City, Arkham Asylum is where Batman's foes who are considered to be mentally ill are brought as patients (other foes are incarcerated at Blackgate Penitentiary). Although it has had numerous administrators, some comic books have featured Jeremiah Arkham. Inspired by the works of H. P. Lovecraft, and in particular his fictional city of Arkham, Massachusetts, the asylum was introduced by Dennis O'Neil and Irv Novick and first appeared in Batman #258 (October 1974); much of its back-story was created by Len Wein during the 1980s.

Arkham Asylum has a poor security record and high recidivism rate, at least with regard to the high-profile cases—patients, such as the Joker, are frequently shown escaping at will—and those who are considered to no longer be mentally unwell and discharged tend to re-offend. Furthermore, several staff members, including its founder, Dr. Amadeus Arkham, and his nephew, director Dr. Jeremiah Arkham, as well as medical staff Dr. Harleen Quinzel, and, in some incarnations, Dr. Jonathan Crane, security chief Lyle Bolton and Professor Hugo Strange, have become mentally unwell.

In addition, prisoners with unusual medical conditions that prevent them from staying in a regular prison are housed in Arkham. For example, Mr. Freeze is not always depicted as mentally ill, but he requires a strongly refrigerated environment to stay alive; Arkham, with special conditions required for certain patients or inmates being a regularity rather than an exception, is seen by authorities to be an ideal location under certain circumstances.

Gotham criminals deemed "criminally insane" or "mentally unfit" by the court of law generally are treated at Williams Medical Center before being deemed dangerous enough to be sent to Arkham Asylum.

Origins 

Serving as a Gotham City psychiatric hospital, Arkham Asylum has a long and brutal history, beginning when its own architect became mentally unwell and hacked his workers to death with an axe. He was convicted and sentenced to spend the rest of his life in the same asylum he had been building. The one-shot graphic novel Arkham Asylum: A Serious House on Serious Earth establishes that the asylum was named after Elizabeth Arkham, the mother of founder Amadeus Arkham. The original name of the asylum was "Arkham Hospital". Its dark history began in the early 1900s when Arkham's mother, having suffered from mental illness most of her life, committed suicide. However, it was later revealed that her son had actually euthanized her and repressed the memory. Amadeus then decided, as the sole heir to the Arkham estate, to remodel his family home in order to properly treat the mentally ill, so others might not suffer the same fate as his mother.

Prior to the period of the hospital's remodeling, Amadeus Arkham treated patients at the State Psychiatric Hospital in Metropolis, where he, his wife Constance and his daughter Harriet had been living for quite some time. Upon his telling his family of his plans, they moved back to his family home to oversee the remodeling. While there, Amadeus Arkham received a call from the police notifying him that Martin "Mad Dog" Hawkins, a serial killer, referred to Amadeus Arkham by Metropolis Penitentiary while at State Psychiatric Hospital, had escaped from prison and sought his considered opinion on the murderer's state of mind. Shortly afterward, Amadeus Arkham returned to his home to find his front door wide open. Inside, he discovered the raped and mutilated corpses of his wife and daughter in an upstairs room, with Mad Dog's alias carved on Harriet's body. Despite this family tragedy, the Elizabeth Arkham Asylum for the Criminally Insane officially opened that November.

With his sanity in tatters, Dr. Arkham designed a floor plan that evoked occult runes, he believed that the pattern would drive away the mysterious bat that haunted his dreams. One of its first patients was Mad Dog, whom Amadeus Arkham insisted on treating personally. After treating Mad Dog for six months, Amadeus Arkham strapped him to an electroshock couch, then deliberately and purposefully electrocuted him. The staff treated the death as an accident, but it contributed to Amadeus Arkham's gradual descent into mental illness, which he began to believe was his birthright. Eventually, Amadeus Arkham was a patient in his own asylum after he tried to kill his stockbroker in 1929, where he died scratching the words of a binding spell into the walls and floor of his cell with his fingernails and belting out "The Star-Spangled Banner" in a loud voice.

Publication history 

Arkham Asylum first appeared in October 1974 in Batman #258, written by Dennis O'Neil and drawn by Irv Novick. In this story, it is named as "Arkham Hospital", although it is not clear what kind of hospital it is. "Arkham Asylum" first appeared in another O'Neil story the following year, but it was not until 1979 that "Arkham Asylum" completely replaced "Arkham Hospital", and the occasional "Arkham Sanitarium", as the institution's name. Also in 1979, the move to have the asylum closer to Gotham had begun; that was completed in 1980, when Batman #326 by Len Wein described the asylum's location "deep in the suburbs of Gotham City". It is perhaps for this reason that Batman #326 is listed in some histories as the first appearance of Arkham Asylum. It was also Wein who, in 1985's Who's Who: The Definitive Dictionary of the DC Universe #1, created its current backstory.

Arkham Asylum has been demolished or destroyed several times in its history, notably during the events of Batman: The Last Arkham (see below). It is also seriously damaged at the beginning of the Knightfall storyline, when Bane uses stolen munitions to blow up the facility and release all the patients. After these events, the asylum is relocated to a large mansion known as "Mercey Mansion". At the beginning of the No Man's Land storyline, the asylum is closed down and all its patients discharged. In this instance, a timer was used to open the doors two minutes before the city is sealed. This is orchestrated by the administrator himself, Dr. Jeremiah Arkham, the nephew of Amadeus Arkham, who had the choice of discharging the patients or watching them all starve or kill each other. In the middle of the story, it is revealed during the Prodigal storyline that Batman has established a hidden base within the sub-basement of the asylum  known as the "Northwest Batcave" but it was blown up by Black Mask during the Battle for the Cowl story arc.

In the Battle for the Cowl one-shot, Dr. Jeremiah Arkham wanders among the remains of the asylum as he muses on his life. He reveals that he has discovered blueprints created by his uncle, Dr. Amadeus Arkham, for a new Arkham Asylum. He also contemplates the fates of his own nonviolent "special" patients: an artist with almost no facial features who must paint facial expressions onto his almost blank face to express himself; a man obsessed with his own reflection in a series of mirrors in his room; and a woman supposedly so ugly, one glance at her face would cause anyone to become mentally ill. Upon discovering his "special" patients (unharmed from the destruction thanks to their secluded cells), Arkham resolves to rebuild the facility according to his ancestor's vision, but to serve as a literal asylum for mentally ill patients in order to shelter them from the outside world. However, when told to be happy with the new development, the artist secretly paints his face white with a hideous grin, reminiscent of the Joker; it is implied that the "special" patients, as well as Arkham himself, have given in to mental illness.

In the Arkham Reborn miniseries, Arkham Asylum is rebuilt and financed by Dr. Arkham. But in Batman #697, Dr. Arkham is revealed to be the new Black Mask and is a patient in his own asylum. It was also revealed during Arkham Reborn, that as both Dr. Arkham and Black Mask, he had begun to manipulate patients, a plotline that culminated in Detective Comics with Alyce Sinner becoming the new head of the facility, but secretly working with Arkham/Black Mask. It was also revealed that the "special" patients were figments of Arkham's imagination.

During Batman Eternal, Arkham Asylum is destroyed as part of the villains' assault on Batman, with Bruce Wayne also being declared bankrupt after Wayne Enterprises loses most of its assets following Hush detonating some of Batman's hidden weapons caches around the city. As a result, Wayne Manor is repossessed by the city and turned into the new Arkham Asylum, but Bruce decides to accept the situation on the grounds that he can now keep a closer eye on his foes in the asylum due to his intimate knowledge of the manor's entrances and exits (after sealing off the entrance to the Batcave from the manor).

Staff

Wardens 

 Dr. Amadeus ArkhamThe founder of the asylum, Amadeus named the institution after his deceased mother Elizabeth.
 Dr. Jeremiah ArkhamThe nephew of Amadeus Arkham. Jeremiah was the head of the asylum in current continuity until recently, in which he too became mentally unwell and became the second Black Mask.
 Quincy Sharpwas the warden featured in the Batman: Arkham games. He dedicated his life to "curing" Gotham City. However, he was also corrupt, as Sharp was cursed with a split personality that divided his mind between himself and a killer.
 Dr. Hugo Strangewas a brilliant psychiatrist who later came to Gotham City after deducing the true identity of Batman. He later became Chief Psychiatrist and eventually warden of Arkham Asylum.

Corrections Officers 
 Aaron CashOne of Arkham's most respected security guards. His hand was bitten off by Killer Croc and he sports a prosthetic hook in its place. Unlike many of his colleagues, Cash is neither mentally unwell nor corrupt and is a trusted ally of Batman.
 Frank BolesA security guard who patrolled near the cell of Solomon Grundy. He was killed by the Emerald Empress.
 Lyle BoltonA former decorated Arkham guard who was so ruthless in how he handled inmates that he was later fired and became "Lock-Up" in order to continue arresting the criminals of Gotham.

Psychiatrists 
 Dr. Joan LelandOnce a colleague of Harleen Quinzel, Dr. Leland soon became her therapist, along with treating other known patients such as Jonathan Crane (Scarecrow) and Harvey Dent (Two-Face).
 Dr. Anne CarverShe was a psychiatrist who was murdered at the hands of Jane Doe. She stole her identity and took her role and hoped to extort Warren White out of millions and steal his identity
 Dr. Alyce SinnerChosen by Jeremiah Arkham as his second-in-command and briefly committed under Arkham's orders. Sinner became head of the asylum after Arkham was revealed as Black Mask. She is secretly a member of Intergang's Church of Crime, working with Black Mask. She has shoulder length brown hair wrapped in red ribbons with sins written on the inside.
Dr. Harleen QuinzelA former psychiatric intern, Quinzel was seduced by the Joker and adopted the supervillain name "Harley Quinn."
Dr. Jonathan Crane A former psychologist who performed fear-inducing experiments on his patients before becoming a career criminal and taking on the alias 'The Scarecrow'.
 Dr. Ant CarleyHe was a psychiatrist who was known for his dangerous testing with LSD and trying to get the patients to open their third eye. He was fired after a week, however, due to his test being seen as unsafe.

Patients 

Originally, Arkham Asylum was used only to house genuinely mentally ill patients having no connection to Batman, but over the course of the 1980s, a trend was established in having the majority of Batman's adversaries end up at Arkham.

Arkham Asylum is also featured in other DC Comics publications, apart from the Batman comic book titles. In Alan Moore's run in Swamp Thing the Floronic Man is detained there and in The Sandman by Neil Gaiman, Doctor Destiny escapes the asylum to wreak havoc on both the real and dream worlds. It has also been featured in varying capacities in a number of DC miniseries events, such as Crisis on Infinite Earths, Identity Crisis, Day of Vengeance and Countdown to Final Crisis, among others.

Many DC Comics characters who have been patients at Arkham Asylum are listed below.

Others

Graphic novels featuring Arkham Asylum

Arkham Asylum: A Serious House on Serious Earth 

Arkham Asylum: A Serious House on Serious Earth is a graphic novel written by Grant Morrison and painted by Dave McKean. It was published by DC in 1989. It made reference to the treatment of several of the patients, such as the attempt to wean Two-Face away from dependence on his coin for decision making, first with a die and then a deck of cards. It once again portrays the asylum as having been taken over by its patients.

A Serious House on Serious Earth has been critically acclaimed, having been called "one of the finest superhero books to ever grace a bookshelf." IGN ranked it as number four in a list of the 25 greatest Batman graphic novels, behind The Killing Joke, The Dark Knight Returns, and Year One, whilst Forbidden Planet named it number eight in their "50 Best of the Best Graphic Novels" list.

Batman: The Last Arkham 

Batman: The Last Arkham was written by Alan Grant; pencils by Norm Breyfogle, originally a four-issue storyline that kicked off the Batman: Shadow of the Bat series. In it, the old Arkham Asylum is destroyed, to be replaced by a new and more modern facility. The story introduces Jeremiah Arkham, the asylum's director and nephew of Amadeus Arkham. In an attempt to discover how criminals, specifically Zsasz, keep escaping, Batman has himself committed to the asylum. Jeremiah uses various methods, such as unleashing many patients on Batman at once, in an attempt to gain psychological insight on the vigilante.

This story makes a few passing references to the events of A Serious House on Serious Earth, such as Amadeus Arkham taping over the mirror, and his journal is shown early in the story. Jeremiah also mentions his relative's descent into mental illness.

An episode of Batman: The Animated Series titled "Dreams in Darkness", also about Batman in Arkham, portrays a similar theme, with the Scarecrow as the chief villain, also replacing Jeremiah Arkham with a more nondescript administrator, Dr. Bartholemew who is portrayed as naïve rather than sinister.

Arkham Asylum: Living Hell 
Arkham Asylum: Living Hell was written by Dan Slott, penciled by Ryan Sook with inks by Sook, Wade Von Grawbadger and Jim Royal. The series was edited by Valerie D'Orazio. Eric Powell created the painted cover art which appeared on both the original series and graphic novel compilation.

This six-issue miniseries and the subsequent trade paperback provided an intricate and multi-layered look at Arkham Asylum from several points of view: director Dr. Jeremiah Arkham; psychiatrist Dr. Anne Carver; the guards, chiefly one Aaron Cash; and the patients. There is a particular focus on previously unknown residents: Jane Doe, a cypher who assumes the identities of those she kills; Junkyard Dog, a man obsessed with trash; Doodlebug, an artist who uses blood in his paintings; the hulking bruiser Lunkhead; Death Rattle, a cult leader who speaks to the dead; and Humpty Dumpty, an obese idiot savant obsessed with taking apart and repairing various objects. The driving force is the recent admission of a ruthless investor, Warren "The Great White Shark" White, as well as the demonic element suggested by the title. White, facing charges of massive fraud, pleads insanity to avoid being sent to prison, knowing he can bribe a Gotham jury. The judge sees through White's attempt to avoid prison and has White admitted to Arkham, which White himself had never even heard of up until that point. He soon realizes the horrors of the place and tries to survive. Ultimately, he is locked in Mr. Freeze's cell and loses his nose and his lips to frostbite while trapped in there, coming to resemble his nickname. He was originally referred to as 'Fish' as new inmates commonly are, but is re-dubbed 'The Great White Shark' by himself. The demonic threat is nullified after the sacrifice of several patients, thanks to the joint effort of Etrigan the Demon and White tricking the demons into sending themselves back to the Underworld.

Black Orchid 
Black Orchid, written by Neil Gaiman and illustrated by Dave McKean, also featured Arkham Asylum. The award-winning graphic novel introduced an updated version of the crimefighter Black Orchid, who dies, is reborn and starts a quest to find her identity. During this she encounters Batman, who directs her to Arkham Asylum, where she meets the Mad Hatter, Poison Ivy, Two-Face and the Joker. Arkham is viewed as a desperate place where patients dwell in terror, much in the same fashion as in A Serious House on Serious Earth, which was also illustrated by McKean.

Arkham Reborn 
Arkham Reborn is a three-part miniseries written by David Hine and illustrated by Jeremy Haun. It tells the story of the rebuilding of the Asylum after having been destroyed by Black Mask during the events of "Battle for the Cowl".

In Batman #697, it is revealed that Dr. Jeremiah Arkham is the new Black Mask. More is revealed about Dr. Jeremiah Arkham in Detective Comics #864 and #865.

Batman: The Man Who Laughs 

The Man Who Laughs is a one-shot prestige format comic book written by Ed Brubaker and illustrated by Doug Mahnke and Patrick Zircher, released in February 2005. The comic reveals some of the asylum's dark history. As a reporter reports on the asylum's renovation, the Joker poisons her and the crew, stealing the news van to broadcast whenever he wants. He later releases criminally insane patients at Williams Medical Center, who, in a short number of weeks, would have been transferred to Arkham Asylum. In the end, Joker is defeated and he himself is locked behind bars, in a straitjacket at Arkham.

The graphic novel was reprinted with Detective Comics #784-786–a storyline entitled "Made of Wood," also written by Brubaker with art by Zircher. In the storyline, Batman and Green Lantern track the "Made of Wood" serial killer, whose killing spree was cut short when he was admitted to Arkham Asylum. Ex-Commissioner James Gordon is also pursuing the killer and he narrows the search down to the two men admitted to Arkham in December 1948, the only living one hardly able to walk and ignorant of the killings. Gordon reaches the grandson of the other, who has taken up the "Made of Wood" killer's mantle.

Alternative versions

The Dark Knight Returns 

The Dark Knight Returns, written by Frank Miller, takes place about 10 years after Batman "retires." It depicts an "Arkham Home for the Emotionally Troubled", presumably a renaming of the asylum which occurs as a result of changing attitudes towards mental health. The Joker is housed there, catatonic since Batman's disappearance, but awakens when the vigilante resumes action. Under the employ of the home is Bartholemew Wolper, a condescending psychologist who treats the Joker humanely, even going so far to arrange for him to appear on a late night talk show, while arguing that Batman himself is responsible for the crimes his enemies commit by encouraging their existence; Wolper is killed when the Joker uses his lethal gas on the talk show audience.

In the sequel The Dark Knight Strikes Again, it is revealed that the patients have taken over and have resorted to cannibalism. Plastic Man is one of the more notable patients in this version of Arkham Asylum.

JLA: The Nail 
In JLA: The Nail, the Joker-using Kryptonian gauntlets provided by a genetically augmented Jimmy Olsen-breaks into the Asylum, erecting a forcefield around it that prevents anyone but Batman, Robin and Batgirl from entering, while forcing the rest of the patients to fight each other for a chance to live as his slave when only one is left standing. Catwoman wins the resulting conflict shortly before Batman breaks into the asylum, but the Joker's gauntlets allow him to capture Batman, forcing him to watch as the Joker brutally tears Robin and Batgirl apart in front of him. Although Catwoman manages to distract the Joker long enough for Batman to escape and damage his gauntlets, the grief-maddened Batman subsequently beats the Joker to death on the asylum roof before the entire building collapses, apparently killing most of the current patients (although he and Catwoman manage to escape, Batman is only tried for the Joker's death once the immediate crisis is resolved, and the sequel confirms that at least Poison Ivy survived the collapse).

Batman: Crimson Mist 
In Batman: Crimson Mist, the third part of the trilogy that began with Batman & Dracula: Red Rain, the now-vampiric Batman, corrupted by his thirst for blood, breaks into the asylum and murders all the homicidal patients-including Amygdala, Victor Zsasz and the Mad Hatter-drinking their blood and chopping off their heads to prevent them coming back as vampires (it is unclear if he did this while reveling in his new power or to try and provoke his old allies into destroying what he had become).

In other media 
As an integral part of the Batman franchise, Arkham Asylum has been featured in other media besides the print comics, including the following:

Television

Live-action 

 Arkham Asylum is mentioned by Barry Allen, who is secretly the Flash, in an episode of the 1990 television series The Flash.
 Arkham Asylum appears in the 2002 television series Birds of Prey.
 Arkham Asylum appears in Gotham. 
 It is established that Arkham Asylum was closed down for 15 years prior to the events of the series. In "Arkham," Arkham Asylum is shown to be in the Arkham District as Mayor Aubrey James plans to improve the district using the plans that Thomas Wayne was going to go with. Carmine Falcone and Sal Maroni were also shown to want some involvement in the plan. Maroni's ally Councilman Zeller has been abducted by the same hitman who killed Councilman Ron Jenkins (who was an ally of Falcone) and is burned alive at Arkham Asylum. At the end of the episode, Mayor James holds a press conference that Falcone will handle the small housing developments in the Arkham District, while Maroni will refurbish Arkham Asylum so that it can be operational again. 
 Around the end of "Harvey Dent," Arkham Asylum is officially reopened where insane bomb maker Ian Hargrove is amongst its latest patients after being rescued from the Russian mob by James Gordon and the Gotham City Police Department. In the aftermath of "LoveCraft," James Gordon is reassigned to guard duty at Arkham Asylum by Mayor Aubrey James. In the follow-up episodes, Gordon makes the acquaintance of Dr. Leslie Thompkins while dealing with an escaped inmate named Jack Buchinsky who is on a quest to get revenge on Sal Maroni for setting him up. It is this escape that Gordon uses to get back in the GCPD by promising Commissioner Loeb that he can catch Buchinsky and his accomplice Aaron Danzing. 
 In the second season, Theo Galavan has his sister Tabitha Galavan break up several Arkham inmates to serve in his plan, including Barbara Kean, Jerome Valeska, Richard Sionis, Aaron Helzinger, Robert Greenwood, and Arnold Dobkins. After Galavan's death, his corpse was taken to an laboratory under Arkham Asylum where the bodies of those like Fish Mooney and Jerome are being kept. This area of the asylum is overseen by Hugo Strange, who conducts various inhuman experiments that include reviving the dead. Edward Nygma is sent here after his crimes are discovered by the GCPD. However, he is later released and declared sane by request of Penguin. During the fourth season, Jerome orchestrates a prison break with Scarecrow and Jervis Tetch to begin his search for his brother Jeremiah Valeska. 
 In the series finale "The Beginning...", which takes place in the distant future, it is revealed that the Riddler and Jeremiah Valeska have been in Arkham Asylum for the past decade, latter one seemingly brain dead after the accident at Ace Chemicals.
 Arkham Asylum appears in the TV series set in the Arrowverse:
 Arkham Asylum appears in the second of the three-part Arrowverse crossover Elseworlds In the crossover, Supergirl, The Flash, and Green Arrow travel to Arkham Asylum to find Dr. John Deegan, an insane doctor who was given the means to alter reality by Monitor. Psycho-Pirate and Nora Fries are shown as the notable inmates when Deegan releases all the inmates on Green Arrow, Flash, Supergirl, and Killer Frost. By the end of the crossover, Deegan is remanded to Arkham Asylum and has his cell next to Psycho-Pirate's cell.
 Arkham Asylum is featured in Batwoman. In the episode "The Rabbit Hole," Jacob Kane arranges for Alice to be sent to Arkham. The transportation was crashed by a bomb made by Catherine Hamilton-Kane's company. In the episode "Down Down Down," Tommy Elliot is remanded to Arkham Asylum after his plot to draw out Batman fails and Kate states that he can't buy his way out of Arkham Asylum. In the episode "Mine Is a Long and a Sad Tale," it was mentioned that Alice's brother figure Mouse had escaped from Arkham Asylum.
 Arkham Asylum appears in the DC Universe/HBO Max series Titans. In the first season finale titled "Dick Grayson", Arkham appears in a dream world created by Trigon where Dick experiences a dark future where Batman started killing his enemies. In the third season, Arkham is now home to Scarecrow following his arrest by Batman. From his cell, Scarecrow acts as a police consultant for the GCPD. Joker is imprisoned in Arkham after he murders Jason Todd. Batman breaks into Joker's cell that night and kills him with a crowbar in revenge. Scarecrow later escapes with help from a resurrected Jason, only to be apprehended again by the third season's finale.
 Arkham Asylum is loosely featured in The Sandman. This version is an institution located in Buffalo, New York.

Animation 

 In Batman: The Animated Series, Arkham has appeared frequently throughout the series. The episode "The Trial" explains that all mentally ill criminals apprehended by the Batman are sent to Arkham rather than jail.
 The television show Justice League featured Arkham in a brief cameo during A Better World, Part 2 in an alternate dimension where an authoritarian version of the League called the Justice Lords took over the world and dispatches villains via execution or lobotomy via Superman's heat vision. The asylum is run by a lobotomized version of the Joker, staffed by other lobotomized villains from Batman's rogues' gallery, and protected by robotic copies of Superman.
 Arkham Asylum appears in The Batman. Like the original Arkham, several major villains end up in this institution, such as the Joker, Harley Quinn, the Riddler, Mr. Freeze, the Ventriloquist, Hugo Strange, Clayface, and Penguin. The staff is far more heavily armored than in its previous incarnation, though patients continue to easily escape. Similar to the Batman Forever tie-in game and Batman Begins, Arkham is presented as occupying a small island on a river inside Gotham.
 Arkham Asylum is seen in Batman: The Brave and the Bold episode "Mayhem of the Music Meister". The eponymous villain visits the place and uses his powers to force the patients to sing before releasing them. Calendar Man, Joker, King Tut, Mr. Freeze, Psycho-Pirate, Doctor Polaris, Scarecrow, Two-Face, Mad Hatter, Top, Crazy Quilt, and Tweedledum and Tweedledee are shown as patients of Arkham Asylum.
 Arkham Asylum is referred to in Beware the Batman in a newspaper article and on a news ticker.
 Arkham Asylum appears in DC Universe's Harley Quinn adult animated series. In the series premiere, "Til Death Do Us Part", the show's titular character is imprisoned there for a year, until she finally escapes with Poison Ivy's help after she caused a prison riot. In "The Line", the Queen of Fables is transferred to Arkham from her imprisonment within a U.S. Master Tax Guide Book following a court order that deemed the latter to be a cruel and unusual punishment, though she is quickly broken out by Harley Quinn. In "All the Best Inmates Have Daddy Issues", a flashback depicts Harley's first meeting with both the Joker and Ivy during her time as a psychiatrist at Arkham, while trying to help Harvey Dent and James Gordon locate a bomb hidden by the Joker. In the season 2 finale, "The Runaway Bridesmaid", Harley is briefly imprisoned at Arkham and escapes after teaming up with Two-Face. Throughout the series, notable patients at Arkham include Harley, Poison Ivy, the Joker, the Riddler, Calendar Man, Killer Croc, Man-Bat, KGBeast, Two-Face, and Doctor Psycho.
 Arkham Asylum appears in Scooby-Doo and Guess Who? episode "What a Night, For a Dark Knight!". Batman discovers Kirk Langstrom is incarcerated at Arkham Asylum meaning that someone else is posing as Man-Bat.
 Arkham Asylum appears in DC Super Hero Girls episode "#NightmareInGotham", being named Arkham Reformatory School, where the Joker escapes from the place.

Films

Live-action

Burton/Schumacher Film Series 

 In Batman Forever, Arkham Asylum was seen at the end of the film. It is designed as a tall, spiralling castle-like structure with narrow hallways lined with brightly lit glass bricks. The Riddler is incarcerated in a large padded cell wearing a baggy straightjacket. The chief psychiatrist is named Doctor Burton, a reference to Tim Burton, who directed 1989's Batman and 1992's Batman Returns. There was originally a more in-depth sequence involving Two-Face escaping from Arkham at the beginning of the film, but it was cut.
 In Batman & Robin, Arkham Asylum is shown a number of times. It first appears when Mr. Freeze is taken there midway through the film and later at the end when he and Poison Ivy are shown sharing a room. This version is several dozen stories tall on an island several hundred feet above water, into which the patients jump to escape. Lightning also emits a bright green flash through the structure's windows. In addition, the Riddler and Two-Face's costumes from Batman Forever can be seen in an evidence room before Bane breaks out to collect Mr. Freeze's armor.

The Dark Knight Trilogy
In Batman Begins, Arkham plays a much larger role than the previous films, with Jonathan Crane (also known as the Scarecrow) being either the administrator or a high-ranking doctor at the asylum and using it to conduct sadistic experiments with his fear gas, with his own patients as guinea pigs. He also uses the pipes under the asylum to empty his toxin into the Gotham water supply. Though still on an island separate from Gotham City's mainland, it is surrounded by a slum region known as the Narrows, instead of the dense forestry of the comics. When it came to a diversion for the fear gas to infect Gotham's water supply, Ra's al Ghul had his men discharge all the patients at Arkham Asylum to keep the police busy. By the end of the film, it is implied that the Narrows has been rendered uninhabitable. Notably, Victor Zsasz is shown as a high-profile criminal being held in the asylum. The National Institute for Medical Research, Mill Hill, London was used as Arkham in the film.

DC Extended Universe 
 At the end of Batman v Superman: Dawn of Justice: Ultimate Edition, Batman reveals to Lex Luthor that he has made arrangements for Luthor to be transferred to Arkham Asylum.
 Arkham appears in a flashback sequence of Suicide Squad featuring Dr. Harleen Quinzel's seduction by the Joker and his subsequent escape.
 Arkham appears in the theatrical cut of Justice League in a post-credits scene where Slade Wilson / Deathstroke meets Lex Luthor.
In the epilogue of Zack Snyder's Justice League, Arkham appears as the "Arkham Home for the Emotionally Troubled", derived from its appearance in The Dark Knight Returns. The sequence is an extended version of the theatrical cut's post-credits scene, additionally revealing how Lex Luthor escaped the facility and replaced himself using an incarcerated inmate as a diversion to intimidate the supervising warden, before meeting Deathstroke on his yacht to discuss his pursuit of the Batman.

Joker 
Arkham Asylum, renamed Arkham State Hospital, appears in Joker where Arthur Fleck steals a document about his mother, revealing a history of mental instabilities.

The Batman franchise 
 Arkham Asylum, under the name Arkham State Hospital, appears in The Batman. The facility is first mentioned when the Riddler publicly exposes details surrounding the history of the Wayne family, including Martha Wayne being a child of the Arkham family, being a former patient at the hospital in addition to having a hidden history of mental illness that her husband Thomas attempted to cover up in order to avoid facing scrutiny during his mayoral campaign, eventually leading him to direct crime lord Carmine Falcone towards intimidating journalist Edward Elliot for threatening to publicly leak said information, with Falcone instead killing him directly. Following his arrest for a series of serial murders related to Gotham City officials, Edward Nashton is incarcerated at Arkham just as he successfully enacts his plan to flood the city during mayor-elect Bella Reál's inauguration. In the aftermath of said events, he befriends another inmate - the Joker.
 A standalone television series centered on the Arkham State Hospital is currently in development for the streaming service HBO Max. It will explore the facility as it evolves after the events of the film and derives a tone reminiscent of Horror films. The series will be developed by The Batman writer/director Matt Reeves, with Antonio Campos serving as showrunner and producer in addition to directing various episodes.

Animation 
 In Batman Beyond: Return of the Joker, the final battle between the original Batman and the Joker is seen taking place at an abandoned and partially demolished Arkham. It is also the same place where Robin, who was earlier kidnapped, then brainwashed and disfigured into resembling a younger version of the Joker, kills the real Joker (either by shooting him with the bang-flag speargun or by pushing him into a tank of water and a mass of wires, causing him to electrocute himself, depending on which version is being seen). A deleted scene, featured on both versions of the DVD as a special feature, has Bruce Wayne touring the abandoned Arkham, where Bruce Wayne's successor as Batman, Terry McGinnis, follows and sees the Joker's corpse hanging with a sign on it saying "I Know". Barbara Gordon states that the inmates and facilities had shifted to a newer location sometime prior to Joker's death, with the Batman Beyond episode "Splicers" also confirming the fact. 
 Arkham makes an appearance in the animated anthology film Batman: Gotham Knight (set between Batman Begins and The Dark Knight) within the segment "Crossfire". Expanding on Lt. James Gordon's line that "the Narrows is lost" at the end of Batman Begins, the film shows that the entire island has become Arkham Asylum's ground, with Narrows residents evacuated from the island after the patients escaped from the facility. After the riot at the end of Batman Begins, the city apparently turned the entire island into a high-tech prison facility in a few months after the incident, enclosed by guard towers, high fences, and the island's natural barrier to keep the inmates from escaping. The Gotham City Police Department also sends officers to its drawbridges to make sure no one would cross, in or out, without permission.
 Arkham is featured in the animated film Batman: Assault on Arkham. The Suicide Squad infiltrate Arkham Asylum in order to attempt to assassinate the Riddler.
 Arkham Asylum appears in the Batman: Unlimited series of animated films, with its inmates regarding Joker, Mister Freeze, Scarecrow, Killer Croc, Bane, Cheetah, Silver Banshee, Clayface, Chemo, Two-Face, Mad Hatter, Riddler and Hush.
 Arkham Asylum appears in The Lego Batman Movie. Batman and Robin break into the Asylum in order to send the Joker into the Phantom Zone. Aside from the Joker, notable inmates include: the Riddler, Scarecrow, Bane, Killer Croc, Man Bat, Two-Face, Catwoman, Clayface, Poison Ivy, Mr. Freeze, the Penguin, Crazy Quilt, Eraser, Polka-Dot Man, Mime, the Catalina Flores Tarantula, King Tut, EggHead, Orca, Killer Moth, March Harriet, Zodiac Master, Gentleman Ghost, Clock King, Calendar Man, Kite-Man, the Catman, the second Zebra Man, Condiment King, Hugo Strange, Doctor Phosphorus, Magpie, the Calculator, Captain Boomerang, a version of the Red Hood and the Kabuki Twins.
 Arkham Asylum appears in Scooby-Doo! & Batman: The Brave and the Bold.
 Arkham Asylum appears in Batman vs. Teenage Mutant Ninja Turtles. In the film, Shredder and Ra's al Ghul break into Arkham, where they kill most of the guards, but captured the survivors and held them hostage. They released Joker, Harley Quinn, Poison Ivy, Mr. Freeze, Two-Face, Scarecrow, and Bane and used the mutagen on them to turn them into mutants. Batman, Robin, Batgirl, and the Turtles arrived to the handle the situation, though they defeated and subdue and rescue the surviving staff, Joker injected Batman with a mix of the mutagen and Joker venom to turn him into a mutant bat. They managed to subdue Batman and turn him back to normal, it was later revealed that Shredder and Ra's al Ghul's real plan was to turn everyone in Gotham into mutants using mutagen mass-produced from Ace Chemicals.

Video games 
 In Batman Forever (SNES game), Arkham Asylum is the first stage.
 In the game Batman: Toxic Chill, Batman and Robin are taken to "Arkham" by Riddler and his companion Mr. Freeze and define them in the same room.
 A crucial showdown takes place in Arkham in Batman: Rise of Sin Tzu.
 Arkham is featured prominently in Batman: Dark Tomorrow. Three quarters of the way through the game, Batman must infiltrate Arkham Asylum through a secret sewer entrance.
 Arkham Asylum is one of the levels of the video game counterpart to Batman Begins.
 Arkham Asylum appears in DC Universe Online. In the game, the chaos of Brainiac's invasions ends up enabling Arkham Asylum's patients to escape from Arkham Asylum. In the "Arkham Asylum Alert" mission, Mr. Freeze, Poison Ivy, and Scarecrow take over Arkham Asylum. In the hero campaign, Batman sends the players to investigate and bring the situation under control. In the villain campaign, Joker sends the players to find out what is going on at his "house" and find out why he was not invited.
 Arkham Asylum is featured in Batman: The Telltale Series. In Episode 2, it is revealed that Thomas Wayne forcibly committed several patients to Arkham Asylum (including Penguin's mother), which tarnishes the Wayne reputation. In Episode 4, Bruce is placed in Arkham Asylum by Mayor Harvey Dent after he was drugged into nearly killing the Penguin. In Episode 5, Lady Arkham stages a prison breakout that is stopped by Batman, the staff (including Dr. Joan Leland) and the GCPD. Noticeable patients in this version are "John Doe", Arnold Wesker, Victor Zsasz, Blockbuster, and Harvey Dent (only if Batman chose to stop him and send him here in Episode 4).
 Arkham Asylum appears in Gotham Knights.

Lego series 
 Arkham Asylum works as the main hub for the villains in Lego Batman: The Videogame, whereas the Batcave works as the main hub for the heroes of the game.
 Arkham Asylum appears in Lego Batman 2: DC Super Heroes. Lex Luthor springs Joker from prison in order to make synthetic kryptonite to help in his presidential election campaign. As a result of Lex Luthor and Joker using a ray that removes black bricks from Arkham Asylum, it caused a breakout where all of its inmates are freed. The generic Arkham inmates and the generic Arkham patients appear as playable characters.
 Arkham Asylum appears in Lego DC Super-Villains. The Joker, along with Captain Cold, Reverse-Flash, Solomon Grundy, and Malcolm Merlyn are arrested by the Justice Syndicate and thrown in Arkham. They are able to break out with the assistance of Livewire, but she and Joker are recaptured by Professor Hugo Strange and used to test his monster-men (inmates he's experimented on), but they escape.

Batman: Arkham series 
 Batman: Arkham Asylum is a video game for the PlayStation 3, Xbox 360, and Microsoft Windows. It was developed by Rocksteady Studios and published by Eidos Interactive in conjunction with Warner Bros. Interactive Entertainment and DC Comics. The game takes place entirely on Arkham Island, a large island situated in the middle of the Gotham Bay. The game's version of Arkham is similar to its description in Gotham Knight, consisting of individual large buildings in a spacious open air island, rather than a single compound. Its locations include Arkham East, Arkham West, Arkham North. Within these areas, the player can explore the Arkham Mansion, the Botanical Gardens, Intensive Treatment, Medical Facility and Penitentiary. The island also features a network of catacombs, caverns, sewers, and a satellite Batcave which Batman had outfitted over the years in preparation for emergencies such as the one he faces in the game. Immediately prior to events of the game, a fire had broken out at Blackgate Penitentiary causing its inmates to be temporarily housed at Arkham. When Joker was apprehended, he was freed by Harley Quinn as Joker begins his plot to take over the island, forcing Batman to fight his way through the Asylum's inmates to recapture the Joker. During the struggle, the Asylum is badly damaged by the rampaging inmates and the Joker's release of Titan into the water supply, enhancing and mutating Poison Ivy's plants. Faith in the asylum was compromised with the discovery that key guards and staff were working with the Joker to organize his assault (Although Doctor Penelope Young was merely manipulated by the Joker rather than acting as a willing accomplice).
 In Batman: Arkham City, the sequel to Batman: Arkham Asylum, Arkham and Blackgate inmates have been relocated to the Gotham mainland as part of Quincy Sharp's Arkham City project with neither Blackgate Penitentiary or Arkham Asylum in any condition to hold inmates or patients after it was ravaged by Poison Ivy in the first game. Arkham City is a walled off section in the northern slums of Gotham where its inmates can run free so long they do not attempt to escape; this territory includes the old GCPD building and the Monarch Theatre where Thomas and Martha Wayne were killed. The security of Arkham City is enforced by a private military group TYGER, with territory controlled by the Joker, Penguin, and Two-Face as the City's primary ganglords (although Two-Face has been losing authority prior to the start of the game), with Mr. Freeze and Poison Ivy satisfied with control of specific buildings. Riddler discreetly controlled members of the others' gangs, and Catwoman, Bane and Zsasz operated independently in secret. Arkham Asylum itself can be seen from the bay of Arkham City, still ravaged and covered in vines from Poison Ivy's attack.
 Arkham Asylum is mentioned in Batman: Arkham Origins (a prequel to Batman: Arkham Asylum). At the time of the game, the asylum had been closed for years, with Blackgate taking all the city's criminals—mentally ill and otherwise. During the credits, Jack Ryder's interview with Quincy Sharp has mentioned that in wake of the recent events Arkham Asylum has been reopened. Sharp decided the asylum is necessary to house the new wave of Gotham's most mentally ill criminals such as the Joker. However, revealed in Shiva's extortion file she, per the orders of Ra's al Ghul, manipulated Sharp into opening the Asylum as part of a long-term plan that led to Arkham City's creation.
 The Asylum is referenced again in Batman: Arkham Knight, where Jason Todd is revealed to have been held hostage and tortured by Joker over a year in an abandoned wing of the Asylum while Batman believed he was dead. Arkham City was once more reintegrated into Gotham City and is currently under reconstruction, sponsored by Wayne Enterprises. Arkham Island and the Arkham City area are viewable from the top of Wayne Tower; though the player cannot interact with them. The game's developers had initially created their first iteration of the Gotham City merely as a skybox, though Arkham Knight takes place in central Gotham itself and players are able to view a greater 'metropolitan area' which surrounds the game's playable area. Prior to the events of the game, Scarecrow, announces a meeting to Gotham's most notorious supervillains, including Two-Face, the Penguin, the Riddler, Harley Quinn, Poison Ivy and the Arkham Knight, held in Arkham Asylum, where it is strongly guarded by military soldiers and drones. In one of the Gotham City Stories, Catwoman tried to infiltrate the meeting, but is spotted by one of the drones. The final confrontation between Batman and Scarecrow takes place in the ruined Asylum, with Jason Todd saving Batman from Scarecrow's control.

Injustice 
 Arkham Asylum is a playable stage in the fighting game Injustice: Gods Among Us. It features multiple Batman villains in the background (Penguin, Riddler, Two-Face, Scarecrow and Killer Croc) who also damage the characters in stage transitions. An alternate version of the stage is called Joker's Asylum, taking place in the alternate universe seen in the story where the Joker Clan has taken over the establishment.
 Arkham Asylum returns as a stage in Injustice 2.

See also 
 Blackgate Penitentiary - A correctional facility located near Blackgate Prison in Gotham City, used to retain custody of non-metahuman supervillains such as crime lords and mob bosses.
 Iron Heights Penitentiary - A maximum-security prison in the DC Universe in a vein similar to Arkham, used to house deranged criminals operating in Keystone City and Central City.
 Stryker's Island - Another penitentiary in the DC Universe similar to Arkham located in Metropolis
 Ravencroft - A similar institute for the mentally insane used to house various supervillains in the Marvel Universe, typically appearing in stories associated with the character Spider-Man.

Notes

References

External links 
 Arkham Care
 Batman-On-Film.com BOF's review of Arkham Asylum, A Serious House on a Serious Earth
 Official Videogame Website

 
Fictional elements introduced in 1974
Psychiatric hospitals in fiction
1974 in comics
DC Comics locations
Psychiatry in the United States in fiction
Fictional buildings and structures originating in comic books
Fictional prisons